High Admiral may refer to:
 A rank in the Star Wars fictional universe
 A rank in the Honorverse fictional universe

See also
 Lord High Admiral (disambiguation)
 Admiral of France (Amiral de France), head of the French Navy